The 1984 Indiana State Sycamores football team represented Indiana State University as a member of the Missouri Valley Conference (MVC) during the 1984 NCAA Division I-AA football season. They were led by fifth-year head coach Dennis Raetz and played their home games at Memorial Stadium. Indiana State finished the season 9–3 overall and 4–1 in MVC play to place second. This was Sycamores' second straight appearance in the playoffs and their last until 2014. The roster included cornerback Wayne Davis and safety Vencie Glenn, who both went on to careers in the National Football League (NFL). Future college head coach Trent Miles was a wide receiver. Quarterback Jeff Miller was selected Honorable Mention All-American.

Schedule

Ranking movements

Notes

References

Indiana State
Indiana State Sycamores football seasons
Indiana State Sycamores football